Joseph Johnson was an English professional footballer who played as a forward in the Football League for Grimsby Town.

References

Year of death missing
English footballers
Rossendale United F.C. players
Grimsby Town F.C. players
Carlisle United F.C. players
Millwall F.C. players
Luton Town F.C. players
English Football League players
Southern Football League players
Sportspeople from Lancashire
Year of birth missing
Association football inside forwards
Association football outside forwards